Nebraska Highway 47 is a highway in Nebraska. It is a highway split into two segments.

Route description

Southern segment
Nebraska Highway 47 begins west of Wilsonville at an intersection with Nebraska Highway 89.  It runs north through farmland into Cambridge and ends at an intersection with U.S. 6 and U.S. 34.

Northern segment
The northern segment of Nebraska Highway 47 begins east of Farnam at an intersection with Nebraska Highway 23.  It goes north through farmland and meets Interstate 80 in Gothenburg shortly after crossing the Platte River.  Also in Gothenburg, Highway 47 connects to U.S. Highway 30 via a short connecting link.  Highway 47 continues north of Gothenburg and ends south of Arnold at an intersection with  Nebraska Highway 40.

Major intersections

Southern segment

Northern segment

References

External links

Nebraska Roads: NE 41-60

047
Transportation in Furnas County, Nebraska
Transportation in Dawson County, Nebraska
Transportation in Custer County, Nebraska